Albemarle-Pamlico Peninsula is a large peninsula (about 3,200 square miles) on the North Carolina coast, lying between the Albemarle Sound to the north and the Pamlico Sound to the south.  The 5 counties of Dare, Hyde, Beaufort, Tyrrell, and Washington all lie wholly or partly on the peninsula.

Much of the peninsula is covered with marshland.  The pocosin marshlands of the Albemarle-Pamlico peninsula drain into the Alligator River, an important link in the intracoastal waterway.

Forty four percent of the peninsula is owned by timber companies, and another twenty one percent of the peninsula is owned by agricultural corporations. This led to a great deal of deforestation on the peninsula in the 1980s, to the extent that only one third of the peninsula's pocosin marshlands continue to exist in their unaltered form.  Soybeans, corn, pines, cattle, and hogs were all raised on the peninsula.  Many of the larger farms have gone bankrupt, but some pine farms continue to exist on the peninsula.

Towns and Cities
Bath
Belhaven
Columbia
Creswell
Engelhard
Fairfield
Manns Harbor
Pantego
Plymouth
Roper
Stumpy Point
Swan Quarter

External links
Where is the Albemarle-Pamlico Peninsula - Dare County (map) lies out on the far tip of the peninsula.

North Carolina
Landforms of Dare County, North Carolina
Landforms of Hyde County, North Carolina
Landforms of Beaufort County, North Carolina
Landforms of Tyrrell County, North Carolina
Landforms of Washington County, North Carolina